Following is a list of senators of Morbihan, people who have represented the department of Morbihan in the Senate of France.

Third Republic

Senators for Morbihan under the French Third Republic were:

 Vincent Audren de Kerdrel (1876–1899)
 Hippolythe Thome de Keridec (1876–1878)
 Charles de La Monneraye (1879–1894)
 Gustave de Lamarzelle (1894–1924)
 Armand Fresneau (1888–1900)
 Charles Riou (1900–1920)
 Geoffroy de Goulaine (1901–1913)
 Roger Audren de Kerdrel (1909–1920)
 Jean Guilloteaux (1913–1924)
 Alfred Brard (1920–1940)
 Louis Guillois (1920–1932)
 Ernest Lamy (1924–1927)
 Alphonse Rio (1924–1940)
 Roger Grand (1927–1933)
 Edmond Filhol de Camas (1933–1940)
 Paul Maulion (1935–1940)

Fourth Republic

Senators for Morbihan under the French Fourth Republic were:

Fifth Republic 
Senators for Morbihan under the French Fifth Republic were:

References

Sources

 
Lists of members of the Senate (France) by department